Brigadier General Igor Gorgan (born 2 August 1969) is a Moldovan military officer who is currently the Chief of the General Staff.

Biography
He was born on 2 August 1969 in Dubăsari. At the age of 18, he joined the Soviet Army, immediately attending the Combined Arms Higher Military School in Novosibirsk until 1991. Upon graduation, he immediately took up a position in an airborne division in Bolgrad, Ukraine. From 1992 to 1995, he was the commander of a guard company in the Ștefan cel Mare 2nd Motorized Infantry Brigade. From 2001 to 2002, he was a student at the United States Army Command and General Staff College at Fort Leavenworth. Beginning in 2003, he took part in NATO-led international missions in Bosnia and Herzegovina, Georgia and Iraq. After he returned to Moldova in 2006, he became an official  in the training directorate. In 2013, he was appointed by President Timofti to the post of Chief of National Army General Staff. His dismissal would be the result of an ongoing feud with Defence Minister Anatol Șalaru. Upon his dismissal, he became an aide to defense ministers Eugen Sturza and Anatol Șalaru. From 2018 to 2019, he was Chief of Strategic Studies at the Alexandru cel Bun Military Academy. On 1 July 2019, days after the national constitutional crisis and the appointment of the Sandu Cabinet, he was made the Chief of the General Staff by President Igor Dodon, replacing Igor Cutie. Dodon presented Gorgan to the commander's office of the National Army on 8 July.

He is currently married with two children. Outside of his native Romanian language, he also is fluent in English, French, Georgian, and Russian.

References

1969 births
Living people
Moldovan generals
People from Dubăsari